Oignies is a commune in the Pas-de-Calais department in the Hauts-de-France region of France.

Geography
The A1 autoroute passes through the commune, alongside a wooded and lake-filled parkland area.

History

Ancient times
The town of Oignies seems to have been inhabited since early Christian times. Then it was known as Ongniacume.

Coal is discovered
In the grounds of the Château of Mme De Clercq on 7 June 1842 an Engineer, Monsieur Mulot, discovered the presence of coal, an economic godsend for the region which then developed a huge mining industry. This was the first discovery of coal in the region.

The two world wars
During the First World War, the town was occupied by the Germans. Shortly before their retreat from the territory in October 1918 they destroyed the town and coal mines.

Between 28 May 1940 and 2 September 1944, the town was once again occupied by the troops of Nazi Germany. Shortly after they arrived the occupying forces burned 380 houses and killed 80 civilians in revenge for the fierce resistance they met on the bridge of the Battery.

In 1919, Oignies had seen the arrival in the town of Georges Clemenceau who came to bestow the "Croix de guerre". In 1948, it was the turn of Vincent Auriol accompanied by François Mitterrand who once again bestowed the cross on the town. He inaugurated a mausoleum remembering those 80 shot on 28 May 1940 and declared Oignies a "Ville Martyre" (martyred town).

End of coal mining
On 21 December 1990, the last truck of coal was hoisted from shaft 9 at Oignies. This well-publicized event marked the end of coal mining in the whole of the north of France.

Heraldry

Population

Notable people
 Guy Drut, born here in 1950, an Olympic champion who won gold at the 1976 Summer Olympics in Montreal in the 110m hurdles.
 Michel Jazy, a former French athlete who won the silver medal in the 1500m at the 1960 Summer Olympics in Rome.
 Saint Mary of Oignies, 13th century A.D.

Places of interest

 The church of St. Barthélemy, rebuilt along with most of the town, after the First World War.
 The coalmining museum.
 The chateau, dating from the sixteenth century.
 The war memorial.

Twin towns
 Buxton, England, since 1940.
 Mutterstadt, Germany, since 2004

See also
Communes of the Pas-de-Calais department

References

External links

 Official town website 
 Website of the agglomération d'Hénin-Carvin 

Communes of Pas-de-Calais
Artois